Cucuteni may refer to the following places in Romania:

 Cucuteni, a commune in Iași County
 Cucuteni–Trypillia culture
 Cucuteni, a village in the commune Durnești, Botoșani County
 Cucuteni, a village in the commune Moțăieni, Dâmbovița County
 Cucuteni, a village in the commune Lețcani, Iași County
 Cucuteni (river), a tributary of the Bahlueț in Iași County